White Dog and the Swing is a 2004 collection of short stories by Nobel prize-winning author Mo Yan. It collects thirty short stories from the 1980s.

References

2004 short story collections
Works by Mo Yan
Chinese short story collections
Chinese contemporary short stories